List of chancellors of the University of Denver

References
https://web.archive.org/web/20090410210607/http://www.du.edu/experience/vision/history.html

University of Denver
Chancellors of the University of Denver